Pictou was a federal electoral district in Nova Scotia, Canada, that was represented in the House of Commons of Canada from 1867 to 1968. It was created in the British North America Act of 1867. It consisted of the County of Pictou. It was abolished in 1966 when it was merged into the riding of Central Nova. It returned two members from 1872 to 1903.

Members of Parliament

This riding elected the following Members of Parliament:

Election results

See also 

 List of Canadian federal electoral districts
 Past Canadian electoral districts

External links 
 Riding history for Pictou (1867–1966) from the Library of Parliament

Former federal electoral districts of Nova Scotia